The Brunswickan is the official student newspaper of the Fredericton campus of the University of New Brunswick, New Brunswick, Canada. It has a circulation of 4,000 and issues are published on the first Wednesday each month, traditionally running 8 issues annually.

Overview 
A founding member of the Canadian University Press, The Brunswickan remains one of the largest community newspapers in Atlantic Canada, and among the largest in Canada, well out-of-proportion to the size of its home campus. In January 2009, the paper switched from broadsheet to tabloid format in response to financial pressures, and in an effort to reduce its impact on the environment. The Brunswickan subsequently dropped its circulation from 10,000 to 6,000 issues per week later that month, and again to 5,000 in 2012. Circulation dropped again to 4,000 in September 2013.

The tagline for the paper, "Canada's Oldest Official Student Publication", combines two facts: the paper is the official student publication for the Fredericton campus of the University of New Brunswick and the first issue was published in 1867, prior to any other official student publication at a Canadian university.

Regional rival, The Dalhousie Gazette at Dalhousie University in Halifax, Nova Scotia, claims the title of "oldest student newspaper in Canada." The Gazette has published consecutively since 1868, whereas there are significant gaps in the publishing history of The Brunswickan.

During the Strax affair of 1968-69 two students were charged with contempt of court over an article published in the Brunswickan that questioned the objectivity of the New Brunswick courts. Both were found guilty. The editor, John Oliver, was fined $50 and required to print a retraction. The author, Tom Murphy, was sentenced to ten days in jail.

In the past, members of the paper have been referred to as "brunsies", a term of pride and affection for some.

Among its notable alumni are Gary Davis, Allan Pressman, Colin B. Mackay, Bliss Carman, Charles G. D. Roberts, Dalton Camp, Fredrik Eaton, Nathan White, Sean Patrick Sullivan, Chris Wilson-Smith, Ben Conoley, Donald Pringle and Kwame Dawes.

The Brunswickan has a sister-publication, The Baron, at the other UNB campus, UNB Saint John.

The Brunswickan has a good-natured rivalry with The Aquinian, the campus newspaper for St. Thomas University which is also located on Fredericton's college hill.

Sections 
 News: Campus and off-campus coverage of student issues and noteworthy happenings, as well as breaking stories.
 Opinion: Editorials, regular columns, and letters to the editor, usually focusing on student and social issues, as well as activism.
 Arts & Lifestyle: Covers community, social issues, culture, arts, and events. 
 Occasional features are also published that vary in subject matter and tie into different sections.

Editorial Board 2021-2022 
 Editor-in-Chief: Marlowe K. Evans
 Creative Director: Olivia Chenier
 Arts and Lifestyle: Harrison Dressler
 News: Taylor Chalker
 Business: Stuart Wallace
 Multimedia: Joe Jonah
Copy: Melissa Spohr

Editorial history 
Editor-In-Chief
2021-22: Marlowe K. Evans
2020-21: Ally Buchanan
2019-20: Brad Ackerson
2018: Book Sadprasid*
2017-18: Emma McPhee
2016-17: Adam Travis
2015-16: Emma McPhee
2014-15: Tess Allen
2013-14: Nick Murray
2012-13: Sandy Chase
2011-12: Christopher Cameron
2010-11: Colin McPhail
2009-10: Sarah Ratchford
2008-09: Josh O'Kane
2007-08: Jennifer McKenzie
2006-07: Tony von Richter (interim), Michele Legendre, Tony von Richter (interim), David Arthurs
2005-06: Brendan Doyle
2004-05: Patrick Reinartz
2003-04: Sean Patrick Sullivan
2002-03: Sean Patrick Sullivan
2001-02: Cindy Brown
2000-01: Cindy Brown
1999-00: Joseph Wilfred John FitzPatrick III
1998-99: Joseph Wilfred John FitzPatrick III
1997-98: Joseph Wilfred John FitzPatrick III
1996-97: Mary Rogal-Black, Joseph Wilfred John FitzPatrick III
1995-96: Mark Morgan
1994-95: Al Johnstone
1993-94: Karen Burgess
1992-93: Allan Carter
1991-92: Kwame Dawes
1989-91: Kwame Dawes
1988-89: Stephane Comeau
1987-88: Mark Stevens; Ernest Dunphy

Note: Sadprasid resigned in October and no replacement was hired for that academic year.

See also 
List of student newspapers in Canada
List of newspapers in Canada

References

External links 
 
 Old Brunswickan issues online in PDF format
 The Baron

Student newspapers published in New Brunswick
Newspapers published in Fredericton
University of New Brunswick
Newspapers established in 1867
1867 establishments in New Brunswick
Weekly newspapers published in New Brunswick